Toroa, named for the northern royal albatross, is an Albatross-class passenger ferry that served Auckland, New Zealand, primarily travelling between the Devonport and Auckland CBD ferry terminals. Together with her sister ship Makora, she ferried about 20,000 passengers a day, until taken out of service in 1980.

The ferry was purchased by the New Zealand Maritime Trust. A volunteer group, the Toroa Preservation Society, worked towards a restoration. However, the well-restored vessel sank in 1998 at Birkenhead Wharf in a storm. Recovered, the ferry now sits on land in Henderson, where restoration work is continuing slowly but regularly.

Other Albatross-class ferries include
Albatross
Kestrel
The Peregrine
Ngoiro
Makora

References

External links 

2020 Google Street View of Toroa at Henderson

Ferries of New Zealand